Astrophytum is a genus of six species of cacti, native to North America.

These species are sometimes referred to as living rocks, though the term is also used for other genera, particularly Lithops (Aizoaceae). The generic name is derived from the Greek words άστρον (astron), meaning "star," and φυτόν (phyton), meaning "plant."

Description
The species of the genus Astrophytum usually grow individually with spherical to columnar green shoots and reach heights of up to 1.5 meters. The shoots are often densely covered with fine white tufts of hair, but sometimes they are completely bald. There are four to ten (rarely three) very noticeable ribs that are not divided into cusps. The large areoles stand close together, but do not merge. The spike is variable. Spines may be present or may be missing entirely.

The funnel-shaped, large flowers are yellow or yellow with a red throat. They appear at the top of the shoots and open during the day. The pericarpel is covered with pointed scales. The cap-shaped seeds have a diameter of up to 2.5 millimeters with a brownish black seed coat which is almost smooth. The edge is rolled towards the sunken hilum.

Species

Synonymy
The genus has several synonyms:
Astrophyton Lawr., orth. var.
Digitostigma Velazco & Nevárez
Maierocactus E.C.Rost
There are a number of species synonyms sometimes seen:

References

"Astrophytum". cactiguide.com. Retrieved July 28, 2005.
"The genus Astrophytum Lem."
"The genus Astrophytum" 
"Desert Tropicals - Astrophytum"
"Astromaniacs". A German / English worldwide forum for fans of Astrophytum

External links

 
Cacti of North America
North American desert flora
Cactoideae genera